There have been two baronetcies created for persons with the surname Joseph, both in the Baronetage of the United Kingdom. One creation is extinct while one is extant.

The Joseph baronetcy, of Stoke-on-Trent in the County of Stafford, was created in the Baronetage of the United Kingdom on 8 July 1942 for the businessman Francis L'Estrange Joseph. The title became extinct on his death in 1951.

The Joseph baronetcy, of Portsoken in the City of London, was created in the Baronetage of the United Kingdom on 16 November 1943 for the businessman Samuel Joseph. He was co-chairman and managing director of the construction company Bovis and also served as Lord Mayor of London from 1942 to 1943. He was succeeded by his son, the second Baronet. He was a prominent Conservative politician and served under Margaret Thatcher as Secretary of State for Industry from 1979 to 1981 and as Secretary of State for Education and Science from 1981 to 1986. In 1987 he was created a life peer as Baron Joseph, of Portsoken in the City of London, in the Peerage of the United Kingdom. On Lord Joseph's death in 1994, he was succeeded in the baronetcy by his son, the third Baronet and (as of 2007) present holder of the title. He does not use his title. Joseph has also not successfully proven his succession to the baronetcy and is therefore not on the Official Roll of the Baronetage, with the baronetcy considered dormant.

Joseph baronets, of Stoke-on-Trent (1942)
Sir Francis L'Estrange Joseph, 1st Baronet (1870–1951)

Joseph baronets, of Portsoken (1943)
Sir Samuel George Joseph, 1st Baronet (1888–1944) 
Sir Keith Sinjohn Joseph, 2nd Baronet (1918–1994) (created a life peer as Baron Joseph in 1987)
Hon. Sir James Samuel Joseph, 3rd Baronet (1955–2019)
Presumed 4th baronet: Sam Nathan Joseph (born 1991)

Notes

References
Kidd, Charles, Williamson, David (editors). Debrett's Peerage and Baronetage (1990 edition). New York: St Martin's Press, 1990,

External links
The Standing Council of the Baronetage, Baronetcies to which no succession has been proved

Baronetcies in the Baronetage of the United Kingdom
Extinct baronetcies in the Baronetage of the United Kingdom
Dormant baronetcies